CommitMental is an Indian Telugu-language romantic comedy web series created by The Viral Fever (TVF) for Aha. It is directed by Pavan Sadineni starring Udhbav Raghunanda and Punarnavi Bhupalam in lead roles. This series revolves around a young couple, Anu and Phani, who after being in a long-distance relationship for three years, face the prospect of marriage. It premiered on Aha on 13 November 2020. It is the remake of 2014–2016 Hindi-language web series Permanent Roommates.

Plot 
CommitMental follows the story of commitment-wary Anu, and Phani, her overeager long-distance boyfriend who returns to India from the United States of America to surprise Anu and to ask her to marry him. Acting upon the advice of her roommate and her own reluctance to marry someone who barely knows her, Anu refuses, but gives in to Phani's persistence. The two eventually strike a compromise, opting to move in together first. The subsequent events- a fallout, followed by a conciliation, and Anu's premarital pregnancy end in the two of them planning their wedding, with unforeseen consequences.

Cast 

 Punarnavi Bhupalam
 Udbhav Raghunandan
Sivannarayana Naripeddi
 Vishnu Oi
 Venkatesh Kakumanu
 Namrata Tipirneni
 TNR
 Sai Swetha
 Jabardasth Apparao
 Raj Mudiraj
 Dinesh Koushika

Episodes

Production 
In 2019, The Viral Fever (TVF) announced that it is going to remake Permanent Roommates in Telugu. They then announced that they are going to produce the remake along with Aha by naming the web series as CommitMental. 

Popular YouTuber Udhbav Raghunanda and film actress Punarnavi Bhupalam were taken as lead actors and the series is directed by Sadineni Pavan, who previously directed Tollywood films Prema Ishq Kaadhal and Savitri.

Reception 
Hemanth Kumar writing for the Firstpost rated the series 2.5/5 and wrote, "Despite moments of genuine humour in CommitMental, we never get enough reasons to feel invested in the leads' romance or their challenges." On performances, Kumar added that "Punarnavi Bhupalam does a good job in her role as Anu, who’s confused about whether she wants Phani in her life or not. And Udbhav fits the role perfectly and his non-stop chatter really gets on to your nerves, which probably was his character brief too."

Neeshita Nyayapati of The Times of India rated the series two stars out of five and wrote "CommitMental has potential to be a relatable, cute series on paper. Sadly it doesn’t rise above the banal and fails to give the viewer enough insight into Anu and Phani’s relationship to feel invested."

References

External links

Indian comedy web series
Indian drama web series
Telugu-language web series
2020 web series debuts
Aha (streaming service) original programming
2020 web series endings